Oyungerel Tsedevdamba (born 26 October 1966 in the Tarialan district of the Mongolian People's Republic) is policy advisor for human rights and public participation to the President of Mongolia, Khaltmaagiin Battulga. Oyungerel is a member of the Democratic Party and former minister of culture, tourism and sports, as well as a former member of the Mongolian Parliament. She was the first female Parliament member in Mongolia. She is known for her human rights work.

Education 
Oyungerel attended Stanford and Yale Universities, as well as the Moscow International Business School and Sverdlovsk State Academy of Sciences. She was Stanford's first Mongolian student, enrolling in 2003 at age 36 in the master’s program in international policy studies.

Career 
Oyungerel's work has including helping pass laws addressing domestic violence and protecting cultural heritage sites, home to Mongolian indigenous people, as well as working to stop smugglers from illegally removing dinosaur fossils from Mongolia. Her interest in dinosaurs began in 2006 with a visit to the American Museum of Natural History, which displayed Mongolian dinosaur fossils the guide said would be returned to Mongolia if the country had a museum to display them.

In 2009, her book Shadow of the Red Star (later titled The Green Eyed Lama) was longlisted for the Man Asian Literary Prize. The sequel, Sixty White Sheep, was published in Mongolian in 2017.

Personal life 
Oyungerel has two children.

References

Living people
Democratic Party (Mongolia) politicians
Government ministers of Mongolia
Stanford University alumni
Yale University alumni
Women government ministers of Mongolia
1966 births
21st-century Mongolian women politicians
21st-century Mongolian politicians
Fulbright alumni